Blood In, Blood Out may refer to:

 Blood In Blood Out, a 1993 American film by Taylor Hackford
 Blood In, Blood Out (Axe Murder Boyz album), 2006
 Blood In, Blood Out (Exodus album), 2014
 13lood 1n + 13lood Out Mixx, a 2020 DJ mix by Denzel Curry